Brje pri Koprivi is a small settlement southeast of Kopriva in the Municipality of Sežana in the Littoral region of Slovenia.

Name
The name Brje pri Koprivi literally means 'Brje near Kopriva'. The name Brje is derived from *Brjane 'hill dwellers', ultimately from Common Slavic *bьrdo 'hill'. Like other settlements with the same name (e.g., Brje, Brje pri Komnu), it is thus a geographical designation for the original inhabitants.

History
It was settled by the Uskoks, as evidenced by the surnames Jurca, Novič, and Gulič as well as the former church (demolished in 1802) dedicated to the Prophet Elijah.

References

External links

Brje pri Koprivi on Geopedia

Populated places in the Municipality of Sežana